Copelatus striaticollis is a species of diving beetle. It is part of the subfamily Copelatinae in the family Dytiscidae. It was described by Hippolyte Lucas in 1857.

References

Further reading

striaticollis
Beetles described in 1857
Taxa named by Hippolyte Lucas